Thanthoni can refer to:

Thanthoni, a panchayat town in Tamil Nadu 
Thanthonni (also spelled Thanthonny and Thanthony), a Malayalam film released in 2010